William Buckland (1734–1774) was a British architect who designed several important buildings in colonial Maryland and Virginia.

Biography
Born at Oxford, England, Buckland spent seven years as an apprentice to his uncle, James Buckland, "Citizen and Joiner" of London. At 21, he was brought to Virginia as an indentured servant to Thomson Mason, brother of George Mason.  Most notable among his repertoire are: Gunston Hall (c. 1755–1759) and Hammond-Harwood House (c. 1774).

Buckland married Mary Moore, the daughter of plantation owner William Moore, around 1758 or 1759. The two had four children, two boys and two girls.

Works
He is known to have worked on the architecture or interiors of:

 Gunston Hall, Fairfax County, Virginia. Patron: George Mason (interiors, c. 1755–59); 10709 Gunston Rd. Mason Neck, VA Buckland,William, NRHP-listed
 Courthouse, Prince William County, Virginia (no longer extant, 1759–61)
Mount Airy, Richmond County, Virginia. Patron: Colonel John Tayloe II (interiors, no longer extant, 1761–64) 
 Hynson-Ringgold House, Chestertown, Maryland (interiors, 1771)
Chase-Lloyd House, Annapolis, Maryland. Patron: Edward Lloyd IV (interiors, 1771–1773); 22 Maryland Ave. Annapolis, MD Buckland,William, NRHP-listed
Hammond-Harwood House, Maryland Ave. and King George St. Annapolis, MD Buckland,William, NRHP-listed

Other works sometimes attributed to Buckland include:

Brice House, Annapolis, Maryland (interiors), NRHP-listed
Menokin, Warsaw, Virginia
Whitehall, Anne Arundel County, Maryland salon interior 
William Paca House, Annapolis, Maryland (interiors) 
Rockledge, Telegraph Rd. Occoquan, VA Buckland,William, NRHP-listed

References

External links
Gunston Hall Plantation
Hammond-Harwood House

1734 births
1774 deaths
Architects from Maryland
American indentured servants
People of colonial Maryland
Virginia colonial people
British emigrants to the Thirteen Colonies
Architects from Oxford
American domestic workers